Kelly Perrault (born December 18, 1973) is a Canadian retired ice hockey defenseman who was an All-American for Bowling Green

Career
Perrault's college career began in 1993 with Bowling Green. After a decent freshman campaign, the Falcons got a new head coach in Buddy Powers. The change in leadership coincided with Perrault's offensive numbers taking off and he nearly tripled his totals as a sophomore. The astounding jump led to Perrault being named an All-American. Despite helping the team finish with a 25–11–2 record, BG got snubbed by the NCAA selection committee and was left out of the NCAA Tournament. Perrault continued his pace as a junior and senior but couldn't stop his team from declining in his final year. After the college season was over, Perrault signed a professional contract with the Chicago Wolves and ended the season in the IHL playoffs.

In his first full year, Perrault took a step back offensively. He found himself playing AA hockey the following year and seemed to rebound. Unfortunately, with each opportunity at the AAA-level, Perrault could never find his scoring game and remained consigned to the lower-tier. He headed to Europe for a year but returned to North America for the remainder of his career afterwards. After helping the Fort Wayne Komets capture the Colonial Cup in 2003, Perrault retired following the next season. He returned after a four year break for a 30-game stint in 2009 but then hung up his skates for good.

Statistics

Regular season and playoffs

Awards and honors

References

External links

1973 births
Living people
Ice hockey people from Alberta
People from Fort Saskatchewan
Canadian ice hockey defencemen
Bowling Green Falcons men's ice hockey players
AHCA Division I men's ice hockey All-Americans
Chicago Wolves players
Austin Ice Bats players
Houston Aeros (1994–2013) players
Birmingham Bulls (ECHL) players
Long Beach Ice Dogs (IHL) players
Hershey Bears players
Rochester Americans players
Quad City Mallards (UHL) players
Straubing Tigers players
Fort Wayne Komets players
Dayton Bombers players